Marriage in the Bible is important to both Judaism and Christianity:

Christian views on marriage
Jewish views on marriage

Gender in the Bible